The Kosh-Tektir Botanical Reserve is located in Ala-Buka District of Jalal-Abad Region of Kyrgyzstan. It was established in 1975 with a purpose of conservation of the key habitat of the Chatkal Yellow Tulip (Tulipa anadroma Botschantz.) - the most beautiful species of yellow-flowering tulips growing in Kyrgyzstan. The botanical reserve occupies 30 hectares.

References

Jalal-Abad Region
Botanical reserves in Kyrgyzstan
Protected areas established in 1975